is a Japanese singer. He was born in Imari, Saga Prefecture. He is one of the two original vocalists of the band , known for their anime soundtracks such as  where Tanaka provided the vocals in the chorus of its opening theme. After leaving Crystal King, he started his solo career and along the line lost his voice after being struck in the throat by a baseball and was never able to regain his original vocal range. He is also featured on the Katamari Damacy soundtrack Katamari Fortissimo Damacy where he sings , the main theme of the game. 

Masayuki rerecorded on one of his greatest hits, Kamen Rider Kuuga's theme song with Rider Chips for the release of Heisei Kamen Rider 20 Titles Commemoration Best, which was released on May 1st, 2019.

Discography (As a soloist) 

  - 1998
  - 1998
  - 2000
 "TRY & CHASE" - 2000
 "Red Desire" - 2000
 "THE MASKED RIDER KUUGA!" - 2001
  - 2004
  - 2019

References 
 Masayuki Tanaka's official website 

Japanese male singers
Living people
Musicians from Saga Prefecture
1951 births
People from Imari, Saga

Singers with a three-octave vocal range